Deveronside Junior Football Club are a Scottish football club from the town of Banff. Founded in 1977, the club were based at Canal Park in Banff before relocating to the newly constructed Myrus Centre in Macduff in November 2016. The club were forced to take a season out in 2006–07 after failing to find a manager but returned the following year.

Honours

 North & Tayside Cup winners: 1988–89
 North Region (North) League winners (10): 1983–84, 1985–86, 1987–88, 1988–89, 1989–90, 1990–91, 1993–94, 1995–96, 1999–00, 2000–01
 North Region Second Division (Gordon Williamson) Trophy: 1978–79, 1984–85, 1985–86, 1986–87, 1987–88, 1995–96, 1996–97, 1997–98, 2000–01
 Morayshire Junior Cup: 1984–85, 1986–87, 1992–93, 1994–95
 Matthew Cup: 1983–84, 1984–85, 1987–88, 1990–91, 1992–93, 2000–01
 Nicholson Cup: 1983–84, 1988–89, 1989–90, 1992–93, 1993–94, 1994–95
 Clive Williamson Trophy: 2000–01
 Robbie Nicol Cup: 1986–87, 1987–88, 1993–94, 1999–00
 Robertson Cup: 1984–85, 1985–86, 1987–88, 1990–91, 1993–94, 1997–98, 2000–01
 Stewart Memorial Cup: 1983–84, 1986–87, 1988–89, 1989–90, 1992–93, 1993–94, 1994–95
 North Drybrough Cup: 1985–86
 Connon Cup: 1992–93
 Elginshire Cup 2018-19

References

External links
 Club website
 Scottish Football Historical Archive
 Non-League Scotland

Football in Aberdeenshire
Football clubs in Scotland
Scottish Junior Football Association clubs
Association football clubs established in 1977
1977 establishments in Scotland
Banff, Aberdeenshire